Ormside is a civil parish in the Eden District of Cumbria, England, which includes the village of Great Ormside and the hamlet of Little Ormside.  It had a population of 133 in 2001, increasing to 167 at the 2011 Census.

See also 

 Listed buildings in Ormside
 Ormside railway station
 Ormside bowl

References

External links
 Cumbria County History Trust: Ormside (nb: provisional research only – see Talk page)
 Ormside at britishlistedbuilding.co.uk

Civil parishes in Cumbria
Lists of listed buildings in Cumbria
Lists of buildings and structures in Cumbria